This is a list of the French SNEP Top 100 Singles & Top 200 Albums number-ones of 2011.

Number ones by week

Singles chart

From the chart edition of 30 January, digital and physical sales have been merged into a sole chart.

Albums chart

From the chart edition of 30 January, digital and physical sales and compilations have been merged into a sole chart.

Top best-selling singles and albums in 2011
This is the 20 best-selling of singles, and albums in 2011.

Singles

See also
2011 in music
List of number-one hits (France)
List of artists who reached number one on the French Singles Chart

References

Number-one hits
France
2011